Beech Hill is an unincorporated community in Giles County, in the U.S. state of Tennessee.

History
The community was likely named from the presence of beech trees near the town site.

References

Unincorporated communities in Giles County, Tennessee
Unincorporated communities in Tennessee